Bhaiaji Superhit is a 2018 Bollywood Hindi-language action comedy film directed by Neerraj Pathak and produced by Chirag Dhariwal. The film features an ensemble cast including Sunny Deol, Preity Zinta, Arshad Warsi, Ameesha Patel, Shreyas Talpade, Sahiil Sagar as Gunda in Sunny Deol Gang and among others . Its music is presented by Zee Music. The film marks the comeback of Bollywood actress Preity Zinta after a 4-year hiatus from films.

Plot
A Varanasi based Don Lal Bhaisahab Dubey (Sunny Deol) dreams of seeing himself on the big screen. To facilitate this mad affair, he seeks the services of Goldie Kapoor (Arshad Warsi) and Tarun Porno Ghosh (Shreyas Talpade) who are playing a director and a writer respectively. Preity Zinta plays Sapna Dubey, Don Lal Bhaisahab Dubey's wife. Ameesha Patel plays Mallika Kapoor, an actress and tries to emulate Sapna Dubey.

Cast 
 Sunny Deol as Lal Bhaisahab Dubey (Bhaiaji 3D) / Funny Singh (double role)
 Preity Zinta as Sapna Dubey
 Arshad Warsi as Goldie Kapoor
 Ameesha Patel as Mallika Kapoor
 Shreyas Talpade as Tarun Porno Ghosh
 Sanjay Mishra as Dr. Gyan Prakash Buddisagar
 Pankaj Tripathi as Builder Gupta
 Jaideep Ahlawat as Helicopter Mishra
 Evelyn Sharma as Stephanie
 Nawab Shah as Mishra's Goon
 Manoj Joshi as Pollice Commissioner
 Amit Mistry as Lucky Singh Laapata
 Ranjeet as Sapna's father
 Mukul Dev as Shakeel
 Brijendra Kala 3D's uncle
 Pankaj Jha as Gupta
 Viivi Altonen

Production
Initial cast announced in 2011 included Sunny Deol, Ameesha Patel, Arshad Warsi, Tusshar Kapoor and Prakash Raj. Release was scheduled for 2012. Claims regarding the film being shelved were rejected by the film's cast and director. Ghai also denied that he was producing the film. In July of the same year, Kapoor left the project due to schedule conflicts with Shootout at Wadala and Kyaa Super Kool Hain Hum. Initially Zinta was removed from the cast due to unavailability of dates on her side. Shreyas Talpade replaced Kapoor.

In April 2013, Zinta confirmed her participation in the production. She plays the don's wife. A 45–days long shooting schedule, beginning in September 2013, was conducted in Udaipur, Rajasthan. Reportedly, in November 2013, there was a dispute between producer Mahendra Dhariwal and Deol. The latter wanted his remuneration before dubbing. Deol gave him the option that they could release the film under the banner of his production company Vijayta Films. Dharival consulted action director Tinu Verma, who advised that Deol should be paid and the project should be completed. However, shooting of a few of Zinta's scenes was delayed due to her involvement with the Indian Premier League. Kharaj Mukherjee will play the role of a police inspector. The director narrated the story to him over phone and he quickly agreed to join the project. Evelyn Sharma learnt Hindi by taking lessons for 2 hours a day. She also requested her friends to use only Hindi while conversing with her. Deol will play a double role. The project was stalled for 4 years before June 2015, when it was reported that filming would resume in July 2015.  It is scheduled for release in October 2018.

Soundtrack 

The songs of the film are composed by Jeet Gannguli, Raghav Sachar, Amjad Nadeem, Sanjeev–Darshan and Neerraj Pathak and music produced by Aamir Khan, Aditya Dev, Chandan Saxena while the lyrics are written by Amjad Nadeem, Shabbir Ahmed, Kumaar, Neerraj Pathak and Sanjeev Chaturvedi.

References

External links 
 
 

2010s Hindi-language films
2018 action comedy films
Films shot in Rajasthan
Films set in Uttar Pradesh
Indian action comedy films
Films scored by Raghav Sachar
Films scored by Jeet Ganguly
Films scored by Amjad Nadeem
Films scored by Sanjeev Darshan